Das Rätsel der Sandbank is a German television series based on the 1903 novel The Riddle of the Sands by Erskine Childers. It was produced by the public television and radio station Radio Bremen, and starring Burghart Klaußner as Davies and Peter Sattmann as Carruthers - the novel's two British yachtsmen and amateur spies.

The original novel, a sensational success at the time of publication, was one of the first signs heralding half a century of enmity and war between Britain and Germany, with the novel's British protagonists unearthing a German plot for the invasion of England and courageously striving to foil it.

See also
The Riddle of the Sands (1979 film with Michael York)
List of German television series

References

External links

1985 German television series debuts
1985 German television series endings
Television series set in the 1900s
Television shows based on British novels
Nautical television series
Espionage television series
German-language television shows
Das Erste original programming